is a 2,899m mountain on the border of Chino, Hara of Nagano, and Hokuto of Yamanashi in Japan. This mountain is the tallest mountain of Yatsugatake Mountains.

Description 
Mount Aka is a stratovolcano. This mountain is a center of the Yatsugatake-Chūshin Kōgen Quasi-National Park.

Climbing route
There are several routes to reach to the top of Mount Aka. The most popular route is from Minoto. It takes about four and half hours.

Access 
 Minotoguchi Bus Stop of Suwa Bus

Gallery

See also
 List of Ultras of Japan

References

External links
 Ministry of Environment of Japan
 Official Home Page of the Geographical Survey Institute in Japan
  ‘Yatsugatake, Tateshina, Utsukushigahara, Kirigamine 2008, Shobunsha

Aka
Aka
Aka
Aka